Various versions of the England national football team have recorded singles over the years, some of which have been hit records.

Singles

See also
 List of England national football team songs

Sources

Discographies of British artists
1